The DTX range consists of electronic drum kits and percussion controllers manufactured by the Yamaha Corporation. They currently cover levels from entry-level to mid-range. DTX kits use sampling for their sounds, meaning each kit has built-in digital recordings of real drums and cymbals. When the drum or cymbal pads are hit, the digital recordings (or samples) are played back to replicate what is being played. On all kits, the sounds are editable – the pitch can be made higher or lower (tuned) and many other features. The higher the range of the DTX, the more functions there are editable.

Current Models

DTX6 Series, the mid-range kit. There are 3 different models - DTX6K-X, DTX6K2,-X and DTX6K3-X. The module, the DTXP,RO has 14 trigger inputs, 39 preset kits and 200 user kits.
The DTX402 Series, the entry-level model. There are 4 different models-the DTX402, DTX432, DTX452 and the DTX482. These are based around a standard 5 piece drum kit with 2 cymbals-crash and ride-whereas the DTX482 has 3 cymbals - 2x crashes and 1x ride cymbal.
DTX Multi12, a midi percussion multi-pad controller. 12 pads with 5 external trigger inputs.

The DTX6 Range 

The DTX6 range was released in November 2020 and consists of 3 new kits:

 DTX6K-X
 DTX6K2-X
 DTX6K3-X

Kit Configurations

Features 

The DTX6 range is powered by the DTXPRO module. The DTXPRO is shipped with 40 preset kits and 200 user kits. The Preset kits can be saved into the User locations and edited. Kits can be copied, moved, re-ordered and deleted as required.

The DTXPRO has over 400 individual voices which cover acoustic drums, electronic drums, cymbals, percussion and effects. Also up to 1000 user samples can be imported by the player and played back from the pads.

The acoustic drum samples were recorded/sampled in different studios around Europe, from a wide selection of vintage and modern acoustic drums and cymbals. All the sounds are editable.

The DTXPRO Module is generationally far ahead of the previous DTX modules. This is partly due to new electronics (ADC and DAC) and headphone amplifier as well as a new processor, not previously used in DTX modules.

The DTXPRO Module has 256 note polyphony which is far higher than all previous DTX modules. This means it can play more sounds at the same time and leave the sounds tailing away naturally without cutting them off.

The Kit Modifiers 

The DTXPRO has a feature called Kit Modifiers, which are three knobs on the front panel which can instantly edit the ambience, compression and effects.

The Ambience Modifier adjusts the amount of 'room' tone heard on the drums. When the sounds are sampled, the room tone is also recorded and it can be adjusted with the Ambience Controller. This can make the drum sound more natural.

The Compressor Modifier adjusts the amount of compression on the overall drum kit sound.

The Effects Modifier controls the amount of effects generated by the two effects processors and the Master effect processor.

Each channel of the module (in other words, each pad) also has control over EQ, Compression, Transient Control and Insert effect.

User Samples 

Up to 1000 samples can be imported via USB drive into the DTXPRO module. This is limited to 760 seconds of mono, or 380 seconds of stereo (44.1 kHz 16 bit in WAV format).

Layering - Stack/Alt 

Every zone of every pad can have up to 4 sounds (internal or user) assigned to it. This is a feature called Stack/Alt. The four sounds can be stacked together so they all play when the pad is hit once. Or, they can be alternated so that:

1st hit – Sound A

2nd hit – Sound B

3rd hit – Sound C

4th hit – Sound D

5th hit – Sound A

Or sounds can be set to change dynamically – sounds can be set to play only in certain dynamic ranges. Using this, the sound can be made to change depending on how hard the pad is hit.

Quiet hits – Sound A

Medium hits – Sound B

Loud hits – Sound C

Very Loud hits – Sound D

User Voice 

Using a feature called User Voice, up to 120 samples can be combined into one multi-layered voice on one pad. Up to 40 samples can be imported onto the head or rim of a pad. These samples are arranged so that there are ten velocity layers (from very quiet to very loud) and four repeating samples at each layer. This means that even if the pad is played exactly the same velocity four times, the same sound will never be heard twice in a row as the module automatically cycles through the repeating samples.

This is something called  'round robin' samples.

To achieve all 120 samples on one pad, a three zone pad must be used – 40 samples on the head, 40 samples on the closed rim (cross stick) and 40 sounds on the open rim (rimshot).

Recording 

The DTXPRO can record itself either into internal memory (up to 90 seconds) or to USB drive (up to 90 minutes). These recordings are recorded @ 44.1 kHz 16 bit in WAV format.

The Recorder can also be used to record the Auxiliary input at the same time as the drums, so the Recorder function can be used to record gigs, or rehearsals.

Connections  

The DTXPRO module can take up to 14 pad inputs.

As well as the trigger inputs, there are also connections for USB (To Device) and USB (To Host), MIDI Out and the master Left and Right audio outputs. The front edge of the module has a 3.5mm (mini jack) Auxiliary Input and a 6.35mm (jack) stereo headphone output.

Rec'n'Share App 

Rec'n'Share is an App (on iOS and Android) which is compatible with DTXPRO (DTX6), EAD10 and the DTX402 kits. The app is connected to the module with a USB cable and any relevant adaptor that attaches to the device. In the case of iPhones, the user needs a USB to Lightning adaptor, such as the Lightning to USB3 adaptor or the Camera Connection Kit (CCK).

Rec'n'Share allows the user to open up any music tracks stored on a device (or on Dropbox) and play along to them. It does not work with streaming sites such as Spotify or Apple Music (and updated iTunes accounts) due to its licensing agreement.

When you open the track, it is analysed and the app can add a click track onto the music. You can speed the track up or slow it down as required and the click track will stay with the track.

You can also set up loop points and get any part of the track to loop, even the whole track if you want.

The track is heard through the headphone output of the DTXPRO module.

On the next level, Rec'n'Share can use the audio from the DTXPRO module and the camera in the device to make videos. This is useful for filming rehearsals, gigs, and lessons.

After filming the video mix (track to drums) can be changed, and the start and end of the video can be cut as required.

Then the video is rendered (converted into a single video file) and can be saved to the device, or uploaded to social media or other site as required.

DTX402 Range 

The DTX402 is currently Yamaha's entry level DTX kit. It was designed to be simple – for educational and beginners situations. It replaced the DTX400 range in 2017. There are 4 kits in the DTX402 range, but not all models are available in all territories - DTX402, DTX432, DTX452, DTX482

Kit Configurations 

The DTX402 range is based on a five piece kit set up. The basic model – DTX402 – can be easily updated piece by piece to the owners requirements.

The DTX 402 module cannot be bought separately and it the only DTX module to use 1/8“ mini jack connectors.

The DTX402 Module 
The DTX402 module has 10 kits built in, all of which are editable. It has 287 drum, cymbal and percussion sounds, and 128 keyboard sounds built in. The keyboard sounds are mainly used for the song playback.

There are 10 songs built in of different styles, which can all be replaced with the users choice of midi song files.

Training Functions 
There are 10 training functions built in too, and the 10 songs can be used with the training functions.

Features 

Despite being the 'simple' kit, the DTX402 range is fully editable. In the manual are lists of editable features and by pressing the kit buttons in different combinations and in different orders, all the features are editable.

If the user does not want to use this method, the DTX402 Touch App for iOS and Android devices can be used. This links to the module via the USB port and can be used to customize kits, edit sounds and kit.

Rec'n'share App  

Rec'n'share is an App (on iOS and Android) which is compatible with the DTX402, EAD10 and DTX6 kits.

The app runs on your device and is connected to the module with a USB cable and any relevant adaptor to attache to the device. In the case of iPhones, you need a USB to Lightning adaptor, such as the Lightning to USB3 adaptor or the Camera Connection Kit (CCK).

Rec'n'share is an app which allows you to open up any music tracks stored on your device (or on Dropbox) and play along to them. It does not work with streaming sites such as Spotify or Apple Music (and updated iTunes accounts) due to its licensing agreement – you have to have a physical digital copy of the track somewhere on your device/system for it to work.

When you open the track, it is analysed and the app can add a click track onto the music. You can speed the track up or slow it down as required and the click track will stay with the track.

You can also set up loop points and get any part of the track to loop, even the whole track if you want.

The track is heard through the headphone output of the DTX402.

On the next level, Rec'n'share can use the audio from the DTX402 and the camera in the device to make videos. This is useful for filming rehearsals, gigs, and lessons.

After filming the video mix (track to drums) can be changed, and the start and end of the video can be cut as required.

Then the video is rendered (converted into a single video file) and can be saved to the device, or uploaded to social media or other site as required.

DTX Multi 12 

The DTXM12, or DTX Multi 12, is Yamaha's 'multi pad' or 'sample-pad' device.  It has 12 pads on its top surface and 5 more pad inputs on the back. The flat pads on the front have a distinctive 'step' in them which allows the player to reach the front and back bar pads without lifting their wrists and keeping the angle of the stick the same.

Features

Sounds 

There are 1061 drum and percussion sounds in the DTXM12 and 216 tuned keyboard voices. The DTXM12 features many sounds that were specially sampled just for the device. It covers many tuned and untuned percussion as well as full GM library and drum kit sounds. The aim of the DTXM12 is that is can be used as a percussion expander for drummers and percussionists in all areas of music. As such it can be found in many different locations.

Kits/Patches 

The DTXM12 has 50 preset patches along with 200 user patches.

Samples 

The DTXM12 can load up to 64Mb of user samples – 12 minutes in mono (and another thing which gives the M12 its name). Samples are loaded in from USB drive. Maximum sample sizes is 2Mb for mono samples and 4Mb for stereo samples. Samples can be WAV or AIFF.

Pressure Sensing 

The pads are pressure sensitive and can be played with the hands as well as stick and beaters. The pads have a pressure sensing layer beneath them and the pressure can be used as a switch to change sounds or dampen them (shorten the sound, like grabbing a cymbal to stop it short).

The pressure sensing can be used in many ways to replicate acoustic instruments. For example;

- Tabla can be made to pitch bend by applying pressure to the pad

- Timpani can be made to mute by applying hand pressure.

- Cymbals can be choked by touching the pad

Stack/Alt 

Every pad, and every input, can have up to 4 sounds (internal or user) assigned to it. This is a feature called Stack/Alt. The four sounds can be stacked together so they all play when the pad is hit once. Or, they can be alternated so that;

1st hit – Sound A

2nd hit – Sound B

3rd hit – Sound C

4th hit – Sound D

5th hit – Sound A etc.

Or sounds can be set to change dynamically – sounds can be set to play only in certain dynamic ranges. Using this, the sound can be made to change depending on how hard the pad is hit.

Quiet hits – Sound A

Medium hits – Sound B

Loud hits – Sound C

Very Loud hits – Sound D

EAD10

(Strictly speaking the EAD10 is not a DTX product, but as it shares many functions with DTX and is a hybrid product of electronic and acoustic drums, it is included here)

EAD stands for Acoustic Electronic Drums. The EAD10 was released in November 2018. The EAD10 is an audio capture device for acoustic drum kits. In other words, rather than use multiple microphones to capture the sound of a drum kit, like in a recording studio, just the EAD can be used to capture the sound of the drum kit. The EAD concept is simple. A small metal Sensor device mounts on the rim of the bass drum on an acoustic drum kit, facing the player. Built into the sensor are two microphones and a vibration sensor, or trigger (see later). The microphones in the Sensor are in a good position, being centrally located and mounted in an XY position, to capture a stereo likeness of the sound of the whole drum kit. The signal passes down two cables to the EAD Module. The EAD module, mounted elsewhere on the drum kit, usually within easy reach of the drummer, allows audio effects to be used on the sound of the drum kit. This means that is it easy to create a 'recorded' drum sound without using external devices.

As the microphones are not in 'traditional' locations to record a drum kit, the EAD can reinforce the sound of the drum kit by using samples to suit the drummer requirements.

Reinforcement can be required as the bass drum (for example) of an acoustic kit is traditionally picked up by a microphone placed in front of it. The bass drum sound picked up by the EAD Sensor can be different from what drummers expect as it picks up the sound from the playing side. If this is the case drummers can trigger a sample from the internal EAD sound library, or a sample they have provided themselves.

The vibration sensor, or trigger in the Sensor, works off shell vibration. When the bass drum is played, the vibration from the head goes to the shell of the bass drum and this is what the EAD Sensor reacts to. It is not a trigger in the conventional sense of a bass drum trigger – it is only designed to fade in as the bass drum is played harder. When the bass drum is played lightly, just the acoustic drum sound is heard. As it is gradually played harder, the sample, triggered by the Sensor, fades in under the bass drum sound to the maximum volume, as set by the drummer.

Scenes 

The EAD stores 'Scenes' – a Scene is a combination of audio effects, samples, click information, trigger settings etc.

The EAD comes with 50 preset Scenes and 200 user Scenes, although all can be backed up to USB so in effect there are limitless Scenes available. Scenes can be named for a particular track or song as required.

Effects 

There are 11 different types of reverb and 21 different audio effects built into the EAD10.

Samples 

There are 757 built in sounds in the EAD10, but users can import up to 100 of their own by using a USB drive. Sample remain inside the device unless deleted.

There is 32Mb of sample memory built into the EAD10. Samples can be a maximum of 1.75Mb for a mono sample or 3.5Mb for a stereo sample. The sample format is 16 bit 44.1 kHz WAV.

Recording 

The EAD10 can record itself either into internal memory (up to 90 seconds) or to USB drive (up to 90 minutes). These recordings are recorded @ 44.1 kHz 16 bit in WAV format.

Additional triggers 

On the back of the EAD module there are additional trigger inputs.

These allow pads and triggers to be added to the system. This could allow a drummer to add on a few pads to their acoustic drum kit and be able to playback samples from them, or they could add drum triggers (see later) to their acoustic drum kit and trigger a sample whenever they play their acoustic drums.

Using triggers on the acoustic kit also means that the kit can now send MIDI data to other devices such as computers. Using the EAD and triggers means an acoustic drums kit performance can be recorded as MIDI data for later editing or correction.

EAD10 Version 2 Firmware 

In November 2019 Yamaha released the Version 2 Firmware for EAD. This allows the EAD10 to be used with mesh head drum kits and with low volume cymbals to make a low volume/silent practice kit for home use or recording.

To use the Version 2 firmware, the user needs to put mesh drum heads and triggers onto all of the drums including the bass drum (the EAD Sensor was not designed to work with mesh bass drum heads which let little vibration through to the shell).

Yamaha also released some special kits (Low Volume Kit Data) which can be used with the Version 2 firmware to allow the user to play drumkit samples using the EAD. This data can all be found at;

Pad Types 

Yamaha makes drum pads from different material, and all pads are compatible with all modules (although some feature may be missing).

Yamaha currently makes pads with TCS ( Textured Cellular Silicone) or rubber playing surfaces. While traditionally frowned on by modern drummers, rubber pads are still faster to react to being played (due to their design) than either TCS or mesh headed pads. This is why you will often see rubber pads on the kits of many touring players.

TCS – Textured Cellular Silicone pads 

TCS is a playing surface material that Yamaha spent 7 years developing. It consists of a layer of silicone with a strong heavy duty polymer stretched across the top. The polymer which is the top surface is a material which was used in the Japanese Shinkansen (aka the Bullet Train) on the concertina section where the carriages join. It is very resilient to high velocity hits (such as drumsticks) but it soft enough not to have a loud sound when hit.

When the silicone is molten it is poured into a mould and air is blown through it. Air bubbles remain in the silicone after it has cured and these air bubbles are what makes the TCS material perform how it does.

When an acoustic drum is played, it is not just how tight the top head is tensioned that makes the drumstick rebound – it is also the air trapped inside the drum. You can test this by playing hard and fast on a double headed drum. It is relatively easy. Then take the bottom head of the drum off and see how much more difficult it is to play the same thing. This is because the air inside the drum can escape – it isn't trapped inside, pushing the sticks back.

The TCS material works in exactly the same way – the bubble in the silicone compress and store the energy of the hit and it is the bubbles expanding that helps to push the stick back. The bubbles work in the same way as the air trapped inside the acoustic drum.

All the XP range of pads use TCS as the head material.

TP Pads 

The TP range of pads all have rubber heads. Rubber has long been used for drum pads as it is very fast to trigger, is very strong, is very reliable and is relatively cheap to make.

The TP range come in a variety of size and with or without rim triggering.

Cymbal pads 

Yamaha's cymbals pads are available in many sizes. The larger ones come with 3 separate zones – bell, bow and edge – to mimic a real acoustic cymbal. All Yamaha cymbal pads connect to the module with a single cable with the exception of the hi hat pads (see later). 

The playing surface is made of rubber with a softer edge.

The RHH153A hi hat pad has built in position sensor so it connect to the DTX module with 2 cables – one for the trigger information and one for the pedal position.

Kick pads 

The DTX has different bass drum (kick) pads. All of them are mono but a few have a pad input on the back which allows a secondary pad to be plugged in to access the second channel on the trigger input.

KP90

Yamaha Acoustic Drum Triggers

DT50S 

The DT50S trigger is a stereo trigger which attaches to the acoustic drums rim and sends a trigger signal whenever it is hit. It effectively turns an acoustic drum into an electronic trigger pad.

The DT50S has a heavy cast metal body and a thumb wheel which tightens it to the drum's rim.

There are two piezo sensors – one under a soft foam tower which rests against the drum head, and the other inside the body of the trigger. The sensor in the foam tower picks up vibrations from the drum head, and the other sensor picks up vibration from the rim of the drum.

The DT50S will fit on triple flange, double flange, single flange and die cast hoops. It will not fit on wooden Yamaha Vintage Hoops without alteration.

It connects to the drum module with a stereo (TRS) jack cable which is supplied.

DT50K 

The DT50KS  trigger is a stereo trigger which attaches to hoop of a bass drum and sends a trigger signal whenever it is hit. It effectively turns an acoustic bass drum into an electronic trigger pad.

The DT50K has a heavy cast metal body and a thumb wheel which tightens it to the bass drum rim.

It has one piezo sensor under a soft foam tower which rests against the bass drum head.

The DT50K will fit on most bass drum hoops. A small rubber insert is supplied to aid fitting on thinner hoops and metal bass drum hoops with a cut out channel.

It connects to the drum module with a jack cable which is supplied. A stereo or mono cable cab be used.

Yamaha DTX Software

Rec'n'share App 

Rec'n'share is an App (on iOS and Android) which is compatible with DTXPRO (DTX6), EAD10 and the DTX402 kits.

The app runs on your device and is connected to the module with a USB cable and any relevant adaptor to attache to the device. In the case of iPhones, you need a USB to Lightning adaptor, such as the Lightning to USB3 adaptor or the Camera Connection Kit (CCK).

Rec'n'share is an app which allows you to open up any music tracks stored on your device (or on Dropbox) and play along to them. It does not work with streaming sites such as Spotify or Apple Music (and updated iTunes accounts) due to its licensing agreement – you have to have a physical digital copy of the track somewhere on your device/system for it to work.

When you open the track, it is analysed and the app can add a click track onto the music. You can speed the track up or slow it down as required and the click track will stay with the track.

You can also set up loop points and get any part of the track to loop, even the whole track if you want.

The track is heard through the headphone output of the DTXPRO module.

On the next level, Rec'n'share can use the audio from the DTXPRO module and the camera in the device to make videos. This is useful for filming rehearsals, gigs, and lessons.

After filming the video mix (track to drums) can be changed, and the start and end of the video can be cut as required.

Then the video is rendered (converted into a single video file) and can be saved to the device, or uploaded to social media or other site as required.

DTX 402 Touch 

DTX402 Touch App is an iOS app to edit the DTX402 module. Almost all aspects of the module can be edited.

Connects to DTX402 with Apple Camera Connection Kit (CCK) and standard USB cable.

DTX M12 Touch 

DTX M12 Touch App  is an iOS app to edit the DTXM12 module. Almost all aspects of the module can be edited except sample loading which needed to be done via USB drive. Many users find this faster than using the internal user interface.

Connects to M12 with Apple Camera Connection Kit (CCK) and standard USB cable.

Older Apps 

DTX 502 Touch (discontinued)

DTX502 Touch App is an iOS app to edit the DTX502 module (discontinued). Almost all aspects of the module can be edited except sample loading which needed to be done via USB file transfer.

DTX 700 Touch (discontinued)

DTX700 Touch App is an iOS app to edit the DTX700 module (discontinued). Almost all aspects of the module can be edited except sample loading which needed to be done via USB drive.

DTX 400 Touch (discontinued)

DTX400 Touch App is an iOS app to edit the DTX400 module (discontinued). Almost all aspects of the module can be edited.

Older DTX Kit Models 

DTX900 Series, the flagship model. It supports up to 15 distinct triggers including 3-zone snare, hi-hat, cymbals and toms. Two inputs are single-zone including the kick. The module contains 100 different drum kits and has both USB and MIDI.

The memory of the module (only the 900, not the 900M) was expandable to max. 1GB SO-DIMM memory (by inserting two 512MB memory modules).
DTX700 Series, the upper-range model. It supports up to 11 distinct triggers including 3-zone snare, hi-hat, cymbals and toms. two inputs are single-zone including the kick.
DTX502 Series, supports up to 12 triggers including a 3-zone snare, two 3-zone cymbals, dual-zone hi-hat and eight single-zone inputs, including kick. The module contains 50 different kits and has both USB and MIDI connections
DTX500 Series, the mid-level model before the DTX502. It supports up to 12 triggers including a 3-zone snare, two 3-zone cymbals, dual-zone hi-hat and eight single-zone inputs, including kick. The module contains 50 different kits and has both USB and MIDI (except the DTX 500 only has MIDI interface) connections The second number e.g. the '2' in DTX520k refers to the configuration of the assembled kit. Generally, a '5' or '6' indicates that the module have all possible triggers fully connected, whereas a '0' indicates that only a basic set of pads and cymbals are included.
DTX400 Series, the entry level model. It supports up to nine triggers, including a 3-zone snare, two cymbals, three tom pads, hi-hat and kick. The module has ten editable kits, and have a USB-MIDI port.
DTXtreme 3 - predecessor to the DTX900 Series. Same module but with different finish and software update.
DTXtreme 2s - predecessor to the DTX700/DTX900 Series. DTXtrem
DTXtreme 1 - Yamaha's original high end DTX. Wooden shell pads with real heads - RHP line (RHP- Real Head Pads)
DTXpress 1/2/3/4 - predecessor to the DTX500 Series
DTXplorer - predecessor to the DTX400 Series. One of Yamaha's best selling electronic kits of all time.
DTXv2 - Updated version of original DTX. Desktop module with trigger inputs on back edge. Rubber pads.
DTX (original) - Yamaha original DTX kit. Desktop module with trigger inputs on back edge. Rubber pads.

Older Yamaha DTX Drum Modules Comparison

Before DTX 

TMX - 1993
1u rack mount drum module with 12 trigger inputs and PCM digital samples
ED20 - 1989
Circular rubber drum pad with built in analogue electronics
ED10 - 1987
Circular rubber drum pad with built in analogue electronics
PMC1 - 1986
2u rack mount drum module with 8 channels of trigger inputs
PTX8 - 1986
2u rack mount drum module with 8 trigger inputs. Wikipedia page here

DTX Artists 

Below are a list of DTX artists.

Carter Beauford

Kenny Aronoff

Marvin McQuitty Jr

Alan White - Yes

Mike Bennett

Ravi Jakhotia - DJ RAVIDRUMS

Mike Johnston - Mikeslessons.com.

Glen Sobel - Alice Cooper

Robert "Sput" Searight - Snoop Dogg, Erykah Badu, Celine Dion, Justin Timberlake, P. Diddy, Timbaland, Myron Butler, Kirk Franklin, and Snarky Puppy.

Thomas Pridgeon - Mars Volta, the Memorials.

Jimmy Keegan – Santana, Spock's Beard

Antonio Sanchez

Mike Bordin - Faith No More, Ozzy Osbourne, Jerry Cantrell and Korn.

Barry Kerch - Shinedown

Ray Luzier – koRn, Dug Pinnick

Benny Rodgers - Big Bang, Mariah Carey

Tom Meadows – Kylie Minogue

References

Drum machines